Timberg is a surname. Notable people with the surname include:

Herman Timberg (1891–1952), American vaudevillian, actor and songwriter
Nathalia Timberg (born 1929), Brazilian actress
Robert Timberg (1940–2016), American journalist and author
Sammy Timberg (1903–1992), American musician and composer
Scott Timberg (1969–2019), American journalist and author